So Far is a music documentary video by the Grateful Dead.  Directed by Jerry Garcia and Len Dell'Amico, it is intended to give a subjective view of the Grateful Dead experience.  The soundtrack includes Dead song performances largely from 1985 (both from a concert on December 31, 1985 and in a rehearsal setting).  The visuals combine scenes of the band playing the songs, other Dead related material, computer animation, and found footage that has been altered and edited in various ways.

So Far was released on VHS and laserdisc in 1987, and on DVD in 2012 in the All the Years Combine compilation box set. It has a running time of 55 minutes.

Song list
 "Uncle John's Band" (Garcia, Hunter)
 "Playing in the Band" (Weir, Hart, Hunter)
 "Lady with a Fan" (Garcia, Hunter)
 "Space" (Garcia, Weir, Lesh, Mydland)
 "Rhythm Devils" (Hart, Kreutzmann)
 "Throwing Stones" (Weir, Barlow)
 "Not Fade Away" (Hardin, Petty)

Credits

Grateful Dead
 Jerry Garcia – guitar, lead and backing vocals
 Mickey Hart – drums, percussion
 Bill Kreutzmann – drums, percussion
 Phil Lesh – bass, backing vocals
 Brent Mydland – keyboards, backing vocals
 Bob Weir – guitar, lead and backing vocals

Production
Len Dell'Amico, Jerry Garcia – directors
Len Dell'Amico – producer
John Cutler – soundtrack producer
Jerry Garcia – sound mixing
Candace Brightman – lighting design
Veronica Loza – editor
Ann Leslie Uzdavinis, Sue Stephens – associate producers

References

 Scott, John W; Dolgushkin, Mike; Nixon, Stu. DeadBase XI: The Complete Guide to Grateful Dead Song Lists, 1999, DeadBase, p. 122
 
 
 
 So Far at the Grateful Dead Family Discography
 So Far at LaserDisc Database

Grateful Dead
Rockumentaries
1987 films
1980s English-language films